Murray Browne (born 20 January 1963) is a former Australian rules football player for  and  in the Victorian Football League. His son Alex also played in the AFL for Essendon.

Browne played 53 games for Collingwood between 1981 and 1985, and Fitzroy in 1986. Playing mainly as a Defender he kicked 6 career goals.

He won the 1981 Collingwood Reserves (now VFL) Best and Fairest award and played in the 1984 final series where the Magpies made the Preliminary final.
 
He is a former President of the Collingwood Past Players Association and former Past Player Director of the AFL Players Association (AFLPA). Opp

References

External links
 

1963 births
Living people
Collingwood Football Club players
Australian rules footballers from Victoria (Australia)
Fitzroy Football Club players